The ASEAN Agreement on Transboundary Haze Pollution is a legally binding environmental agreement signed in 2002 by the member states of the Association of Southeast Asian Nations to reduce haze pollution in Southeast Asia. The Agreement recognises that transboundary haze pollution which results from land and/or forest fires should be mitigated through concerted national efforts and international co-operation.

As of September 2014, all ten ASEAN countries have ratified the haze agreement.

History
The agreement is a reaction to an environmental crisis that hit Southeast Asia in the late 1990s. The crisis was mainly caused by land clearing for agricultural uses via open burning on the Indonesian island of Sumatra. Satellite images confirmed the presence of hot spots throughout Kalimantan/Borneo, Sumatra, the Malay Peninsula and several other places, with an estimated 45,000 square kilometres of forest and land burnt. Malaysia, Singapore and, to a certain extent, Thailand and Brunei were particularly badly affected.

The haze is nearly an annual occurrence in some ASEAN nations. Dangerous levels of haze usually coincide with the dry season from June to September when the southwest monsoon is in progress. Southwest monsoon winds shift the haze from Sumatra, Indonesia towards the Malay Peninsula and Singapore, sometimes creating a thick haze that can last for weeks.

Negotiation history
The agreement was established in 2002, though has some foundation in a 1990 agreement made among ASEAN Ministers of Environment which called for efforts leading to the harmonization of transboundary pollution prevention and abatement practices.

The treaty also builds on the 1995 ASEAN Cooperation Plan on Transboundary Pollution and the 1997 Regional Haze Action Plan. This treaty is an attempt to bring the action plan into function.

Parties to the agreement

Institutional structure
The agreement is managed by the Ministers of Environment and other representatives from the respective ASEAN countries.  Meetings are coordinated under the ASEAN Socio-Cultural Community Council (ASCC), one of three councils, subsidiary to the ASEAN summit and its chair.

Activities
The treaty calls for haze to be mitigated through concerted national efforts and intensified regional and international co-operation in the context of sustainable development. This is to be done through monitoring and prevention activities.

Protocols
The official procedure or system of rules that informs this agreement is the 'ASEAN Way' set of region norms and codes of diplomatic conduct characterised by principles of non-interference, consultation, consensus, quiet diplomacy, symbolism, and organizational minimalism.

Achievements
In October 2013 ASEAN leaders approved a joint haze monitoring system at a cost of US$100,000. Additionally, Singapore has offered to start working directly with Indonesian farmers to encourage sustainable practices and minimise the problem over time by "tackling the haze issue at its root". Singapore has worked with farmers in this way in Indonesia's Jambi province in the past.

Shortcomings
Indonesia, as the primary haze producing party to the problem, was the last ASEAN country to ratify the agreement in 2014, 12 years after it was first signed in 2002. Concerns remain over the ability of the Indonesian government to monitor and effect changes to the problem.

The treaty failed to prevent the annual return of the haze between 2004 and 2010, and again in 2013, 2014 and 2015. Recently Indonesia has been placed as the world's third largest greenhouse gas emitter with 75% of its emissions stemming from deforestation.

Key debates in literature and policy community
The 'haze treaty' is accused of being vague and lacking enforcement mechanisms or strong instruments for dispute-resolution. However, ASEAN has clearly tried to depart from its institutional culture in attempt to achieve deeper co-operation on this issue. This is evident in that this is a legally binding treaty, something ASEAN has vehemently opposed in the past.

The treaty is ill-served by the ASEAN style of regional engagement which adamantly protects national sovereignty. The result is that states are compelled to act in their own self-interest rather than regional interests. Additionally, the close relationships between key economic actors and political elites have meant maintenance of the status quo.

In 2014, Singapore enacted the Transboundary Haze Pollution Act to penalize emissions that cause harm across national boundaries.

See also
 2005 Malaysian haze
 2006 Southeast Asian haze
 2013 Southeast Asian haze
 2015 Southeast Asian haze
 Asian brown cloud
 Southeast Asian haze

References

External links
 Documents on the agreement
 ASEAN Haze Online 
 On-The-Ground Team Provides Insight Of Causes Of Riau Fires

ASEAN treaties
Environmental treaties
Treaties concluded in 2002
2002 in Southeast Asia
2002 in the environment
Treaties of Malaysia
Treaties of Singapore
Treaties of Brunei
Treaties of Myanmar
Treaties of Vietnam
Treaties of Thailand
Treaties of Laos
Treaties of Cambodia
Treaties of the Philippines
Treaties of Indonesia
2002 in Malaysia
Southeast Asian haze